Dmitri Anatolyevich Prokopenko (born 24 May 1972) is a former Russian professional footballer who played as a striker.

Football career
Prokopenko made his debut as a senior in the Soviet Second League B in 1990, with FC Tom Tomsk. In his country, in which he won the 1993 Russian Cup, he also represented six other clubs, appearing in the 1993–94 European Cup Winners' Cup (one game) and the 1996–97 UEFA Cup (four) with FC Torpedo Moscow.

In 1997–98, Prokopenko moved to Portugal where he remained six seasons, spending three apiece in the first and second divisions, his first being with S.C. Braga. He achieved top level promotions in 1999 with C.D. Santa Clara and 2001 with Varzim SC, scoring career-bests of (respectively) 12 and 11 goals.

Prokopenko retired at the age 36, after a couple of seasons with FC Sportakademklub Moscow.

External links

1972 births
Footballers from Moscow
Living people
Soviet footballers
Russian footballers
Association football forwards
Russian Premier League players
FC Tom Tomsk players
FC Torpedo Moscow players
FC Torpedo-2 players
FC Chernomorets Novorossiysk players
FC Luch Vladivostok players
FC Fakel Voronezh players
Primeira Liga players
S.C. Braga players
C.D. Santa Clara players
Varzim S.C. players
C.F. Estrela da Amadora players
Russian expatriate footballers
Expatriate footballers in Portugal
Russian expatriate sportspeople in Portugal
FC FShM Torpedo Moscow players
FC Sportakademklub Moscow players